Buena Ventura Lakes, more commonly known as BVL, is a census-designated place (CDP) in northern Osceola County, Florida, United States, near Kissimmee.  Its population was 26,079 at the 2010 census. It is part of the Orlando–Kissimmee–Sanford, Florida Metropolitan Statistical Area. The community is served by the Osceola Library System.

Buena Ventura Lakes is very well known as a Puerto Rican and New Yorican neighborhood (Little Puerto Rico or Little New York).

Geography
Buena Ventura Lakes is located northeast of Kissimmee, near the interchange of the Osceola Parkway and Florida's Turnpike.  Its northern side is adjacent to Meadow Woods in Orange County.

Demographics 

As of the census of 2000, there were 21,778 people, 6,901 households, and 5,645 families residing in the CDP. The racial makeup of the CDP was 62.66% White, 11.78% African American, 0.38% Native American, 2.68% Asian, 0.09% Pacific Islander, 17.48% from other races, and 4.93% from two or more races. Hispanic or Latino of any race were 54.63% of the population.

There were 6,901 households, out of which 41.4% had children under the age of 18 living with them, 60.1% were married couples living together, 16.4% had a female householder with no husband present, and 18.2% were non-families. 13.2% of all households were made up of individuals, and 5.6% had someone living alone who is 65 years of age or older.  The average household size was 3.15 and the average family size was 3.42.

In the CDP, the population was spread out, with 29.1% under the age of 18, 9.6% from 18 to 24, 28.6% from 25 to 44, 21.7% from 45 to 64, and 11.0% who were 65 years of age or older.  The median age was 34 years.  For every 100 females, there were 93.4 males.  For every 100 females age 18 and over, there were 89.7 males.

The median income for a household in the CDP was $39,023, and the median income for a family was $40,764. Males had a median income of $26,768 versus $21,314 for females. The per capita income for the CDP was $14,742.  About 7.9% of families and 10.2% of the population were below the poverty line, including 11.6% under the age of 18 and 11.5% ages 65 or older.

As of the 2010 Census, there were 26,079 people, and 8,415 households in the CDP. The population density was 4,675.3 people per square mile. There were 9,340 housing units in the CDP. The racial make up of the CDP was 61.2% white (15.1% non-Hispanic white), 14.2% black or African American, 0.6% American Indian or Alaska Native, 2.6% Asian, 0.1% Pacific Islander, and 4.9% were from two or more races. Hispanic or Latinos of any race made up 69.6% of the population, Puerto Ricans alone made up 44.5 percent (11,618) of the area's population. 6.5% of the population was under 5 years old, 26.4% was under 18 years old, and 11.5% was 65 years or older. The median household income was $41,155, and the per capita income was $15,950. 16.7% of the population lived below the poverty line. 68.9% of the population 5 years or older spoke a language other than English at home. 78.9% of the population aged 25 or older was a high school graduate or higher, and 11.2% of the population aged 25 or older had a bachelor's degree or higher.

References

Census-designated places in Osceola County, Florida
Greater Orlando
Census-designated places in Florida